The 2019 Soeratin Cup season is the 17th season of Soeratin Cup national round, an official football tournament which is intended for footballers under the age of seventeen and fifteen held by PSSI. The qualifying round already held in 2018.

Under-17 

The national round of Soeratin Cup U-17 held in Malang Regency and Blitar. Matches are held in Gelora Brantas Stadium and Kusuma Agrowisata Stadium in Batu, Paskhas Stadium and Arhanud Stadium in Malang, and also Gelora Supriyadi Stadium in Blitar for third place and final. Thirty-two teams from each provincial association competed. The round began on 27 January 2019 and finished with a final on 9 February 2019.

PKN Penajam Utama U17s from East Kalimantan were the defending champions. But they were eliminated in the group stage.

Persebaya U17s from East Java won the title, defeating Persipan U17s 2–0 in the final.

Teams

Group stage

Group 1

Group 2

Group 3

Group 4

Group 5

Group 6

Group 7

Group 8

Knockout stage

Round of 16 

|}

Quarter-finals 

|}

Semi-finals 

|}

Third place 

|}

Final 

|}

Under-15 

The national round of Soeratin Cup U-15 held in Blitar Regency. Matches were held in Gelora Supriyadi Stadium and Gelora Bumi Penataran Stadium. Twenty-one teams from each provincial association was planned to compete. But before the tournament start, three teams withdrew, leaving only 18 teams competed. The round began on 27 January 2019 and finished with a final on 7 February 2019.

Askot Bandung from West Java were the defending champions, but they could not defend their title because they did not qualify for the national round.

SSB All Star Rahuning U15s from North Sumatra won the title, defeating Persis U15s 2–1 after extra time.

Teams

Group stage

Group 1

Group 2

Group 3

Group 4

Group 5

Group 6

Knockout stage

Quarter-finals 

|}

Semi-finals 

|}

Third place 

|}

Final 

|}

See also
 2019 Liga 1
 2019 Liga 2
 2019 Liga 3
 2018–19 Piala Indonesia

References

Piala Soeratin
Piala Soeratin
Piala Soeratin
Soeratin Cup